Greenidge is a surname. Notable people with the surname include:

 Abel Hendy Jones Greenidge (1865–1906), writer on ancient history and law
 Akil Greenidge (born 1996), English cricketer
 Alvin Greenidge (born 1956), former West Indian cricketer
 Carl Greenidge (born 1978), English cricketer
 Charles Wilton Wood Greenidge (1889–1972), diplomat and anti-slavery activist
 David Greenidge, Bermudian cricketer
 Ethan Greenidge (born 1997), American football player
 Geoff Greenidge (born 1948), West Indian cricketer
 Gordon Greenidge (born 1951), Barbadian cricketer
 Kaitlyn Greenidge, American writer
 Kerri Greenidge, American historian and academic
 Kirsten Greenidge, American playwright
 Reiss Greenidge (born 1996), English-Jamaican professional footballer
 Ricardo Greenidge (born 1971), Canadian sprinter and bobsledder
 Robert Greenidge (born 1950), Trinidadian steelpan player
 Ronuel Greenidge (born 1983), Guyanese chess player
 Terence Lucy Greenidge (1902–1970), English author and actor
 Troy Greenidge (born 1992), St Lucian association footballer